Ptilodactyla is a genus of toe-winged beetles in the family Ptilodactylidae. There are more than 30 described species in Ptilodactyla.

Species

 Ptilodactyla acuta Johnson & Freytag, 1978
 Ptilodactyla amamioshimana
 Ptilodactyla angustata Horn, 1880
 Ptilodactyla atra Laporte de Castelnau, 1836
 Ptilodactyla carinata Johnson & Freytag, 1978
 Ptilodactyla castanea Laporte de Castelnau, 1836
 Ptilodactyla corporaali Pic, 1923
 Ptilodactyla emarginata Chevrolat, 1870
 Ptilodactyla equilobata Chapin, 1927
 Ptilodactyla exotica Chapin, 1927
 Ptilodactyla formosana Nakane, 1996
 Ptilodactyla guadelupensis Legros, 1947
 Ptilodactyla humeralis Motschulsky, 1863
 Ptilodactyla hyperglotta Johnson & Freytag, 1982
 Ptilodactyla isoloba Johnson & Freytag, 1982
 Ptilodactyla lacordairei Laporte de Castelnau, 1836
 Ptilodactyla macrophthalma Legros, 1947
 Ptilodactyla militaris Chevrolat, 1870
 Ptilodactyla nanoderma Johnson & Freytag, 1982
 Ptilodactyla nitens Laporte de Castelnau, 1840
 Ptilodactyla nitida De Geer, 1775
 Ptilodactyla nitidissima Pic, 1927
 Ptilodactyla obscuriceps Pic, 1923
 Ptilodactyla ramea Lewis, 1895
 Ptilodactyla rouyeri
 Ptilodactyla scabrosa Champion, 1924
 Ptilodactyla sericea Laporte de Castelnau, 1836
 Ptilodactyla serricollis (Say, 1823)
 Ptilodactyla sinensis
 Ptilodactyla strangulata Pic, 1924
 Ptilodactyla thoracica Laporte de Castelnau, 1840

References

Further reading

External links

 

Byrrhoidea
Articles created by Qbugbot